Lisbon Railroad Depot is a historic railway station located at Lisbon in St. Lawrence County, New York. Lisbon was first served with a station in the 1850s by the Ogdensburg and Lake Champlain Railroad. The current building was built in 1930 as the second reconstruction of a railway depot at Lisbon by the Rutland Railway.  It is a one-story, frame building, measuring 23 feet by 68 feet with a hipped roof and wide overhanging eaves.  It closed as a depot in 1961 and is now the town museum.

It was listed on the National Register of Historic Places in 2000.

References

External links
Lisbon Depot Museum website

Railway stations on the National Register of Historic Places in New York (state)
Railway stations in the United States opened in 1930
Railway stations closed in 1961
Former Rutland Railroad stations
Museums in St. Lawrence County, New York
Railroad museums in New York (state)
History museums in New York (state)
National Register of Historic Places in St. Lawrence County, New York
Former railway stations in New York (state)
1930 establishments in New York (state)
1961 disestablishments in New York (state)